The women's flyweight (51 kilograms) event at the 2014 Asian Games took place from 27 September to 1 October 2014 at Seonhak Gymnasium, Incheon, South Korea.

Like all Asian Games boxing events, the competition was a straight single-elimination tournament. All bouts consisted of three three-minute rounds. 

A total of 16 women from 16 countries competed in this event, flyweight division, limited to fighters whose body weight was less than 51 kilograms.

Mary Kom of India won the gold medal after beating Zhaina Shekerbekova from Kazakhstan in the final bout.

Schedule
All times are Korea Standard Time (UTC+09:00)

Results 
Legend
TKO — Won by technical knockout

References

Results

External links
Official website

Boxing at the 2014 Asian Games